Hobhouse is a rare English surname, generally belonging to members of a family originally from Somerset. Those currently with this surname are members of several branches of this patronymic that achieved prominence from the 18th century. Originally merchants, the family diversified into the slave trade, joined the ranks of the West country gentry, accumulating wealth through advantageous marriages and entering into local and national politics, both with success.

Notable Hobhouses include:
Isaac Hobhouse (1685–1763), English slave trader and merchant
Benjamin Hobhouse (1757–1831), British politician 
John Hobhouse, 1st Baron Broughton (1786–1869), British politician and memoirist
Thomas Hobhouse (1807–1876), British Liberal Party politician
Edmund Hobhouse (1817–1904), bishop of Nelson, New Zealand, and an antiquary
Reginald Hobhouse (1818–1895), first Archdeacon of Bodmin and father of Emily and Leonard
Arthur Hobhouse, 1st Baron Hobhouse (1819–1904), English judge
Henry Hobhouse (East Somerset MP) (1854–1937), English landowner and Liberal politician
Emily Hobhouse (1860–1926), publicised the poor conditions inside the British concentration camps built in South Africa during the Second Boer War
Charles Hobhouse (1862–1941), British Liberal politician, a member of the Liberal cabinet of H H Asquith between 1911 and 1915
Leonard Hobhouse (1864–1929), British liberal politician and proponent of social liberalism
Stephen Hobhouse (1881–1961), English peace activist, prison reformer, and religious writer
Arthur Hobhouse (1886–1965), long-serving English local government Liberal politician, the architect of the system of National Parks of England and Wales
Hermione Hobhouse (1934–2014), architectural historian and conservationist
John Hobhouse, Baron Hobhouse of Woodborough (1932–2004), British Law Lord
Wera Hobhouse, a German-born Liberal Democrat Member of Parliament
Will Hobhouse, English businessman and investor
Kate Hobhouse,  British heiress, businesswoman and philanthropist

Hobhouse may also mean:
Hobhouse, Free State, town in South Africa

English-language surnames